William Saunders (by 1497 – 1570) was an English politician.

He was the eldest son of Henry Saunders of Ewell, Surrey.

He sat on the Surrey bench as a Justice of the Peace from 1541 to 1564 and was appointed High Sheriff of Surrey and Sussex for 1562–63.

He was a Member (MP) of the Parliament of England for Gatton in 1529 and Surrey in October 1553, November 1554 and 1555.

He married twice: firstly Jane, the daughter and coheiress of William Marston of Horton, Surrey, and the widow of Nicholas Mynn of London and Norfolk, with whom he had 3 sons and at least 1 daughter and secondly Joan, the widow of Thomas Gittons of London, with whom he had 4 daughters.
He was succeeded by his eldest son Nicholas.

References

15th-century births
1570 deaths
People from Surrey
English MPs 1529–1536
English MPs 1553 (Mary I)
English MPs 1554–1555
English MPs 1555
High Sheriffs of Surrey
High Sheriffs of Sussex